A Fugitive from Matrimony is a 1919 American silent comedy film directed by Henry King and starring H.B. Warner, Seena Owen, and Adele Farrington.

Cast
 H.B. Warner as Stephen Van Courtlandt 
 Seena Owen as Barbara Riggs 
 Adele Farrington as Mrs. E. Elmer Riggs 
 Walter Perry as Zachariah E. Riggs 
 Christine Mayo as Edythe Arlington 
 Matthew Biddulph
 John Gough 
 Lule Warrenton

References

Bibliography
 Donald W. McCaffrey & Christopher P. Jacobs. Guide to the Silent Years of American Cinema. Greenwood Publishing, 1999.

External links

1919 films
1919 comedy films
American comedy films
Films directed by Henry King
American silent feature films
1910s English-language films
American black-and-white films
Film Booking Offices of America films
Silent comedy-drama films
1910s American films
Silent American drama films
Silent American comedy films